Korey Jarvis (born October 4, 1986) is a Canadian wrestler who most notably won a gold medal in the 125 kg category in men’s freestyle wrestling at the 2014 Commonwealth Games.
He has additionally, competed and won the Canadian National Wrestling Championships for three consecutive years in both freestyle and Greco-Roman styles, the only wrestler to have done so. In July 2016, he was officially named to Canada's 2016 Olympic team. At the 2016 Summer Olympics in Rio, he placed 8th in the 125 kg category in men’s freestyle wrestling. Jarvis most recently placed 7th in the 125 kg category in men’s freestyle wrestling at the 2017 World Wrestling Championships in Paris, France.

Jarvis studied at the Conestoga College, and has a daughter Brynlee. He took up wrestling aged 14. Between 2010 and 2014 he moved from the 96 kg to 125 kg class to avoid cutting weight before competitions, as he was normally heavier than 100 kg.

References

External links
 

1986 births
Living people
Wrestlers at the 2014 Commonwealth Games
Commonwealth Games gold medallists for Canada
Commonwealth Games silver medallists for Canada
Canadian male sport wrestlers
Pan American Games silver medalists for Canada
People from Elliot Lake
Sportspeople from Ontario
Wrestlers at the 2010 Commonwealth Games
Wrestlers at the 2015 Pan American Games
Wrestlers at the 2011 Pan American Games
Wrestlers at the 2016 Summer Olympics
Commonwealth Games medallists in wrestling
Pan American Games medalists in wrestling
Wrestlers at the 2018 Commonwealth Games
Wrestlers at the 2019 Pan American Games
Olympic wrestlers of Canada
Medalists at the 2015 Pan American Games
Medalists at the 2019 Pan American Games
20th-century Canadian people
21st-century Canadian people
Medallists at the 2010 Commonwealth Games
Medallists at the 2014 Commonwealth Games
Medallists at the 2018 Commonwealth Games